The sternal angle (also known as the angle of Louis, angle of Ludovic or manubriosternal junction) is the synarthrotic joint formed by the articulation of the manubrium and the body of the sternum.

The sternal angle is a palpable clinical landmark in surface anatomy.

Anatomy
The sternal angle, which varies around 162 degrees in males, marks the approximate level of the 2nd pair of costal cartilages, which attach to the second ribs, and the level of the intervertebral disc between T4 and T5. In clinical applications, the sternal angle can be palpated at the T4 vertebral level.

The sternal angle is used in the definition of the thoracic plane. This marks the level of a number of other anatomical structures:

The angle also marks a number of other features:
 Carina of the trachea is deep to the sternal angle

Passage of the thoracic duct from right to left behind esophagus
 
 Ligamentum arteriosum
 
 Loop of left recurrent laryngeal nerve around aortic arch

The angle is in the form of a secondary cartilaginous joint (symphysis).

This is where the 2nd rib joins with the sternum. A clinically useful feature of the (manubriosternal) joint is that it can be palpated easily. This is because the manubrium normally angles posteriorly on the body of the sternum, forming a raised feature referred to as the sternal angle.

History
The sternal angle is also called the angle of Louis, but the reason for that name was lost. Once thought to be after Antoine Louis or Wilhelm Friedrich von Ludwig, it is now believed to be after Pierre Charles Alexandre Louis.

See also
 Thoracic plane
List of medical mnemonics

References

External links
  - "Thoracic Wall: Bones"

Bones of the thorax